The Alabama Crimson Tide men's basketball team represents the University of Alabama in NCAA Division I men's basketball. The program plays in the Southeastern Conference (SEC).  In the conference it trails only long-time basketball powerhouse Kentucky in SEC tournament titles, is third behind Kentucky and Arkansas in total wins, and it is tied for second behind Kentucky, in SEC regular season conference titles. Alabama was retroactively recognized as the pre-NCAA tournament national champion for the 1929–30 season by the Premo-Porretta Power Poll. The team has appeared in the NCAA tournament 23 times, most recently in 2023. Alabama's current head coach is Nate Oats. 

The men's basketball program has spent most of its history in the shadow of Alabama's football team, but has risen in stature over the past several decades. Under former coach Mark Gottfried, the team achieved a No. 1 national ranking briefly in 2003, and competed for an NCAA Regional Tournament Championship in 2004. The program was notable as a regular conference basketball contender in the 1980s and early 1990s under the direction of coach Wimp Sanderson and in the 1970s under coach C. M. Newton. As of 2023, Alabama has 10 NCAA Tournament Sweet 16 appearances. 

In the 2003–04 season, the team defeated #1-seeded Stanford in the NCAA tournament, and reached the Elite Eight round where they lost to the eventual national champion, Connecticut. Under Oats, the team has continued to craft its own distinct tradition, with SEC titles in 2021 and 2023, and their best-ever season in the latter as the No. 1 seed in the NCAA tournament.

History
Former coaches with at least five years with the Crimson Tide include the following: Hank Crisp (1923–1942, 1945–1946), Hayden Riley (1960–1968), C. M. Newton (1968–1980), Wimp Sanderson (1980–1992) – Alabama's winningest coach (.692), David Hobbs (1992–1998), Mark Gottfried (1998–2009), and Anthony Grant (2009–2015).

Other coaches include John Dee, D.V. Graves, Floyd Burdette, and Charles A. Bernier.

C. M. Newton
In 1968, legendary Alabama football coach Paul "Bear" Bryant, who was also Alabama's athletic director, called Kentucky men's basketball coach Adolph Rupp looking for someone to turn around Alabama's basketball program. Rupp recommended C. M. Newton, a former backup player at Kentucky who had been at Transylvania University for 12 years.  In 12 seasons at Alabama, Newton led the Tide to a record of 211–123. The Crimson Tide won three straight SEC titles under Newton (1974, 1975, and 1976), the only program besides Kentucky to accomplish this feat.  Newton also guided Alabama to four NIT and two NCAA Men's Division I Championship tournament berths, prompting the school to name a recruiting suite in his honor in 2006.

Just as he did at Transylvania, Newton recruited Alabama's first black player, Wendell Hudson, in 1969, integrating his second team in as many coaching stops.

Wimp Sanderson
Newton resigned as head coach after the 1980–81 season to become assistant commissioner of the SEC.  He was succeeded by his top assistant, Wimp Sanderson.  He had been at Alabama since 1960 as a graduate assistant to Newton's predecessor, Hayden Riley; he was named a full-fledged assistant in 1961.  In 12 years as head coach his teams averaged 21.8 wins a year, with a 267–119 record, and they won 4 SEC tournaments. They played in one NIT and eight NCAA tournaments making the "Sweet 16" five times. Sanderson is the only coach in Alabama history to win 200 or more games in his first 10 years. He was the SEC Coach of the Year in 1987, 1989 and 1990, and was the National Coach of the Year in 1987.

Sanderson was best known for wearing garish plaid sports jackets on the sidelines.  At one point, Coleman Coliseum was known as the "Plaid Palace", and the mid-court logo was painted in a crimson-and-white plaid pattern.

David Hobbs
Hobbs was hired at Alabama as an assistant coach for Wimp Sanderson in 1985 and spent seven years as an assistant in Tuscaloosa helping the Crimson Tide win one SEC Championship and four SEC Tournament crowns while the Tide made four appearances in the NCAA Tournament's Sweet 16. As an assistant, he had the opportunity to coach such All-SEC performers as Robert Horry, James "Hollywood" Robinson and Latrell Sprewell.

When Sanderson left Alabama following the 1992 season, Hobbs was named head coach. In his first season, the Tide finished 16–13 and advanced to the NIT. In 1994 and 1995, Alabama recorded 20-win seasons and advanced to the NCAA Tournament behind the play of future NBA All-Star Antonio McDyess. In 1996, Hobbs led UA to a 19–13 mark and a berth in the NIT Final Four. He resigned his post following the 1998 season after compiling a 110–76 (.594) career record and producing nine All-SEC players.

Mark Gottfried

Mark Gottfried served as the Crimson Tide's head coach from the 1998–99 season until midway through the 2008–09 season. Gottfried played 3 seasons of basketball at Alabama under Wimp Sanderson, and the Crimson Tide advanced to the Sweet Sixteen in each of those seasons. He was hired by Alabama in March 1998 after coaching at Murray State for three seasons.

The Crimson Tide achieved the highest pinnacle ever for the school in both the NCAA Championship Tournament and the Associated Press Poll reaching the Elite Eight in the tournament in 2004 and reaching the No. 1 spot in the nation in the AP poll in 2002, both under Mark Gottfried's command.

Gottfried led the Tide to its only SEC Championship under his watch during the 2001–02 season, although the team never won a conference tournament championship during his tenure. For his efforts in 2002, Gottfried was named SEC Coach of the Year by both the Associated Press and his fellow Southeastern Conference coaches. Perhaps his biggest accomplishment as coach at Alabama was leading the Crimson Tide to five consecutive NCAA tournaments from 2002 to 2006, another first for the school that occurred under his watch.

Gottfried resigned on January 26, 2009, with 11 regular season games still remaining on the team's schedule.  Then Athletic Director Mal Moore named long-time Alabama assistant and former player, Philip Pearson as interim head coach for the remainder of the 2008–09 season.

Anthony Grant
On March 27, 2009 Anthony Grant agreed in principle to become the 20th Crimson Tide head men's basketball coach.  Grant came to Alabama after serving as the head coach at VCU from 2006 to 2009.

After a mediocre first season, Grant led the veteran 2010–11 team to a SEC West title and a 2nd-place finish in the  2011 NIT. The 2011–12 team endured the suspensions of several star players to finish with a 21–12 record and a berth in the 2012 NCAA Division I men's basketball tournament, where they lost in the round of 64 to Creighton.  This was the Crimson Tide's first trip to the NCAA Tournament since 2006.  In March 2015, Grant was fired by Alabama after six seasons.  Assistant coach John Brannen served as interim head coach for the 2015 NIT tournament.

Avery Johnson
On April 5, 2015, Avery Johnson agreed to become Alabama's next head coach. The former NBA coach said he was attracted to the position because he perceived it as "a big challenge" in that Alabama is not a "perennial favorite" and has never won a championship before.  Johnson's 2017–18 team finished with a 20–16 (8–10) record and was invited to the NCAA tournament. The next season, the Tide finished 18–16 (8–10) and Johnson was let go at the end of the campaign.

Nate Oats
On March 27, 2019, Nate Oats was named Alabama's next head coach. Oats was previously the coach for the Buffalo Bulls, and had led them to three NCAA tournament appearances in the past four years. After a 16–15 first season, Oats' second season brought Alabama the first SEC regular-season title since 2002 and the first tournament title since 1991. Then in 2023, Oats coached Alabama to their second SEC regular season and tournament championship in three years. The Tide were a No. 2 seed in the 2021 tournament, where they fell to UCLA in overtime in the Sweet Sixteen, then returned as the No. 1 overall seed in the 2023 NCAA tournament.

Oats also holds the best record against AP top 10 teams in Alabama history.

Roster

Arena

The Crimson Tide basketball team practices and plays in Coleman Coliseum, a multi-purpose arena on the UA campus in Tuscaloosa. The arena was built for $4.2 million and opened in 1968 as a replacement for the aging Foster Auditorium. In 2005, the building underwent a renovation in which more seats were added. The arena officially seats 15,314 people.

Coleman Coliseum was named for Jefferson Jackson Coleman, a prominent alumnus and longtime supporter of the University of Alabama. Until his death in 1995, he was the only person that had attended every Alabama football bowl game, starting with the Rose Bowl Game on January 1, 1926. Prior to 1990, the building was known as Memorial Coliseum.

Fan support

Mark's Madness
"Mark's Madness" was a student organization named after former Crimson Tide coach Mark Gottfried, which is also a play on the nickname for the NCAA basketball tournament, "March Madness". It was created by a group of Alabama students in January 2000 in an attempt to create a more exciting atmosphere in Coleman Coliseum.  During the Gottfried era, the Crimson Tide was an impressive 137-27 (.835) in Coleman Coliseum. Mark's Madness was the largest student organization on campus during its time. The end of Mark Gottfried's tenure in early 2009 also meant the end of the Mark's Madness name.

Crimson Chaos
After Coach Anthony Grant was hired, a group of senior students approached the UA Marketing Department in the summer 2009 about resurrecting the student section organization. During the first exhibition game of the 2009 season, it was announced that the new name of the student organization for supporting Alabama basketball would be "Crimson Chaos".

As Crimson Chaos entered its second year, it officially registered as a University of Alabama student group and adopted a new format. In addition to supporting men's basketball, Crimson Chaos expanded to support all University of Alabama sports, becoming the official student group of athletics at the university. The group also tried new things to make the atmosphere in Coleman Coliseum as intimidating as it was in previous years, including adding the "Roll Tide Roller Coaster".  The newly energized environment Crimson Chaos created in Coleman Coliseum helped the Tide complete an undefeated season at home (for the 2010–11 season) with a 19–0 record, including wins over then #12 Kentucky, Georgia, Mississippi State.

Post-season results

NCAA tournament
Alabama has appeared in the NCAA Tournament 24 times. It has reached the Sweet Sixteen nine times and the Elite Eight once in 2004. Alabama has an overall NCAA Tournament record of 25–23.

* Vacated by the NCAA

NIT appearances
Alabama has appeared in 16 National Invitation Tournaments, reaching the championship game on two occasions. Alabama has an overall NIT record of 24–19.

All-time leaders

Former players
Alabama has seen its stars go on to win nine NBA Championships and earn six All-Star selections, six All-Defensive Team honors, three All-Rookie honors and more than $390 million in the NBA. Former Alabama players have gone on to suit up in nearly 10,000 NBA games and have scored more than 90,000 cumulative points.

Tide alumni currently in the NBA

Source: Basketball Reference

Tide alumni in international leagues

 Retin Obasohan (born 1993), basketball player for Hapoel Jerusalem of the Israeli Basketball Premier League
 Levi Randolph (born 1992), basketball player for Hapoel Jerusalem of the Israeli Basketball Premier League

All–Americans
 Lindy Hood; 1930
 Jim Homer; 1947
 Jerry Harper; 1955 & 1956
 George Linn; 1956
 Jack Kubiszyn; 1958
 Bob Andrews; 1965
 Wendell Hudson; 1973
 Leon Douglas; 1973, 1975 & 1976
 Charles Cleveland; 1975
 T. R. Dunn; 1974 & 1977
 Reggie King; 1976, 1978 & 1979
 Eddie Phillips; 1980 & 1982
 Ennis Whatley; 1983
 Derrick McKey; 1987
 James Robinson; 1991 & 1993
 Erwin Dudley; 2002
 Mo Williams; 2002
 Kennedy Winston; 2005
 Ronald Steele; 2006
 Richard Hendrix; 2008
 Alonzo Gee; 2009
 Collin Sexton; 2018
Brandon Miller; 2023

All-time record vs. current SEC teams

Retired numbers

Alabama has retired one jersey number, 20 for Wendell Hudson (F), who played Forward for Alabama 1969-1973.

References

External links